Carmel Bay is a bay of the Pacific Ocean, along the central coast of California in Monterey County.

The bay's coastline includes Carmel City Beach and Carmel River State Beach, with wildlife largely protected by the 'Carmel Bay Ecological Reserve'.

Marine protected areas
Several areas in Carmel Bay have been designated marine protected areas under California's Marine Life Protection Act. 'Carmel Bay State Marine Conservation Area' (SMCA) is entirely underneath Carmel Bay, and both 'Carmel Pinnacles State Marine Reserve' (SMR) and 'Point Lobos State Marine Reserve' are partially underneath Carmel Bay.

No living marine resources may be taken from these areas, except from 'Carmel Bay SMCA', and from there only recreational fishing for finfish and limited "by hand" commercial harvesting of giant kelp and bull kelp, by permit.

Toponymy

The first Europeans to discover the bay were Spanish mariners led by Juan Rodriguez Cabrillo in 1542, sailing up the California coast without landing. In 1602, Spanish explorer Sebastián Vizcaíno named the nearby "Rio de Carmelo" to honor the three Carmelite priests on his expedition; the river empties into the bay, and so the names Carmelo and Carmel were later applied to the bay, a mission, the settlement, and other nearby features.

Climate

The area around Carmel Bay experiences a cool summer Mediterranean climate (Köppen climate classification Csb) typical of coastal areas of California. The wet season is from October to May, and summers are often overcast, the sun blocked by marine layer clouds which can produce drizzle. September and October (Indian Summer) offer the best weather of the year, with an average high of 72 °F. The average annual rainfall in Carmel-by-the-Sea is 15 inches per year and the average temperature is 57 degrees F.

Gallery

References

Bays of California
Bodies of water of Monterey County, California
Carmel-by-the-Sea, California
Landforms of Monterey County, California